Robert Waldron may refer to:
 Robert E. Waldron (1920–2000), member of the Michigan House of Representatives
 Robert F. Waldron (1903–1952), member of the Washington House of Representatives